Albert Vivian Rankin (17 February 1893 – 20 June 1971) was an Australian rules footballer who played with Geelong in the Victorian Football League (VFL). His brothers Cliff and Doug as well as his father Teddy and other members of the family played league football for Geelong.

Rankin started his career as a forward, but played most of his football as a centreman. A player with exceptional pace, he was also a regular user of the drop kick. In 1917 he won Geelong's best and fairest award. He captained Victoria at interstate football in 1922 and then Geelong in 1923. His brother Cliff was vice captain. This was the first time in VFL history that a pair of brothers filled both positions at the same time. It turned out to be Bert Rankin's last season in the league as, controversially, he lost his spot in the side during the finals and walked out on the club. His brother, Cliff, refused to take the field in support of his brother.

He is credited with suggesting that Geelong adopt the nickname of the Cats. Rankin made his senior VFL debut one year and 320 days after the retirement of his father; a VFL/AFL record.

After the disappointment of the 1923 season, Rankin left Geelong to coach the Dimboola Football Club.

In 1915, Rankin married Winifred Hornsey. He died in Dimboola in 1971.

References

External links

1893 births
Australian rules footballers from Geelong
Geelong Football Club players
Chilwell Football Club players
Carji Greeves Medal winners
1971 deaths
Bert